Finland attracted over 6.8 million foreign tourists in 2018, with 53 percent coming from other European Union states. In 2017, the value added by tourism was about 4.6 billion euros, or 2.6% of the Finnish GDP, providing approximately 140,200 jobs.

Statistics

Most visitors arriving to Finland come from:

Attractions

Finland is famous for its many lakes, nearly 200,000 of them (larger than 500 m2/0.12 acres). Tampere is the biggest city on the Finnish Lakeland with other major cities being Jyväskylä, Mikkeli, Lahti, Joensuu, Lappeenranta, Kuopio, and Savonlinna. Finland is also known to have excellent water quality, and green deep woods and forests around the sea, rivers, and the waterways.

In wintertime, Finland provides opportunities for cross-country skiing and alpine skiing.

Throughout Finland, Santa Claus (Joulupukki) is commonly considered to live on the Korvatunturi fell in Lapland. In addition, the largest town in Finnish Lapland, Rovaniemi, has two theme parks dedicated to the character: Santa Claus Village and Santa Park. Finnish Lapland (Rovaniemi and surroundings) is also the best place in the country to see the aurora borealis.

Another theme park in the country is Moomin World, located in the outskirts of Naantali. The park is based on the popular Moomins franchise, created by Tove Jansson.

The biggest picnic of the year called Vappu is held on April 30 - May 1. The celebration happens in every city and village across the country.

Museums in Finland

Art galleries
 Ateneum
 Kiasma
 Sinebrychoff Art Museum
 Helsinki Art Museum
 Amos Rex

Other museums
 Museum of Finnish Architecture
 Finnish Museum of Natural History
 Military Museum of Finland
 Finnish Railway Museum – Hyvinkää
 Jokioinen Museum Railway

Northern Finland and winter sports 
In the winter there is a large snowcastle with an Ice hotel built every year in the northern town of Kemi. Rovaniemi is a place from which to see the aurora borealis or northern lights. Tourists in the north of the country in winter often enjoy trips in reindeer sleighs with Sami drivers, in dog sleighs, or on snowmobiles.

It is also possible to ski, with downhill resorts at Saariselkä and Levi, and many cross country ski tracks throughout the northern part of the country. Ice hockey is a popular sport in winter, and it is possible to go ice yachting, or ice skating on the ice. Most lakes are also frozen, so ice fishing (pilkkiminen) is quite popular.

Cities 

Helsinki, Finland's capital and largest city, receives many visitors year-round. During the summertime thousands of tourists approach Helsinki by cruising boats travelling across the Baltic Sea. Helsinki is known as a clean, modern, and safe meeting point between the east and west.

Other popular tourist destinations within Finland include Tampere, Jyväskylä, Turku, Oulu, Kuopio, Rovaniemi, and Porvoo.

Helsinki 

Helsinki is the capital and largest city in the country, although it is relatively small compared to other European capitals.

Because Helsinki is located on the coast of the Baltic Sea and has many kilometres of coastline, most of its central districts are near the seaside. Helsinki is considered a maritime city and is popularly called the daughter of the Baltic.

Helsinki's coastal position makes it ideal to experience in the summertime from one of the many sightseeing ferries leaving from the port of Helsinki. Many of Helsinki's main attractions are also related to the sea, including the Suomenlinna naval fortress (a UNESCO World Heritage Site) and the Seurasaari Island with its parks and open-air museum. Locals often spend sunny days at the Hietaniemi beach (often simply called Hietsu), Helsinki's main beach in the district of Töölö.

In the winter-time Helsinki's northern position makes it dark for most of the day, with lighting fixtures such as Aleksanterinkatu's Christmas street (Joulukatu). During the coldest months of the winter, it is very common for locals to go for walks on the frozen sea, although authorities recommend caution when the ice is thin. There are also many places for ice swimming along the coast, some with saunas.

Air travel to Helsinki is via Helsinki Airport, situated in the neighboring city of Vantaa, a city part of Greater Helsinki. Helsinki also has popular cruiseferry links with Stockholm, Sweden and Tallinn, Estonia. Silja, Viking and Tallink are the biggest ferry operators.

Helsinki is also the home of the Linnanmäki amusement park, which features five rollercoasters and many other rides, including the world's first Intamin ZacSpin rollercoaster.

Helsinki is a safe city for tourists and a safe place to live. In terms of personal safety, Finland was ranked 14 out of 163 countries according to Global Peace Index 2019.

Helsinki also has efficient tourist information system maintained by the City of Helsinki Tourism & Convention Bureau located in the city center next to the Esplanadi park.

Helsinki was ranked 10th of the most expensive cities in the world according to UBS Group AG's Prices and Earnings report for 2018. Travelers should plan to spend around US$216 or €199 per day on their vacation in Helsinki, which is the average daily cost of staying in a 4-star hotel, visiting 2 popular attractions, using public transportation, and eating out in mid-range restaurants with a glass of wine included.

Tampere 

Tampere, also known as the "Manchester of Finland", has often been rated as the most popular city in Finland; perhaps it is precisely for this reason that over the years it has grown into Finland's second largest and the second best-known Finnish city in the world after Helsinki. The old industrial city built on between lakes Näsijärvi and Pyhäjärvi, and along Tammerkoski rapids has also proved to be quite a significant tourist destination with its various national and international events, museums (such as Moomin Museum) market places (such as Tampere Market Hall) and, of course, its Särkänniemi amusement park, not to mention the world-acclaimed nature in Tampere. Tampere's local traditional food "mustamakkara" in particular has aroused a lot of interest in the world, all the way to celebrity chef Anthony Bourdain. Tampere also have been officially declared the "Sauna Capital of the World".

Many of Finland's most important highways between different cities intersect at Tampere, such as the Helsinki-Tampere Highway (part of E12). Also, air travel to Tampere is via Tampere-Pirkkala Airport, situated in the neighbouring municipality of Pirkkala, a part of Tampere sub-region.

Tampere is also known for several educational institutions, such as University of Applied Sciences and Police University College; the Tampere University, like the city, is also the second largest of its kind in Finland.

Jyväskylä 

Lonely Planet calls Jyväskylä as a Mecca for architecture lovers around the world for its large collection of Alvar Aalto buildings. The city is the biggest city on Finnish Lakeland and capital of Central Finland. Later, a modern architect Arto Sipinen, a pupil of Aalto, has influenced in the cityscape since the 1970s by designing most of the new university buildings in the city.

The Alvar Aalto Museum and the Museum of Central Finland form a centre of culture in the immediate vicinity of the historical campus of the University of Jyväskylä. Both museums are designed by a functionalist Alvar Aalto. The Alvar Aalto Museum displays the artist's most important work and design. The Museum of Central Finland specializes in cultural history. It serves both as the town museum of Jyväskylä and the provincial museum of Central Finland. Nokkakivi Amusement Park is about 20 km from Jyväskylä.

One of architect Aalto's most significant works Säynätsalo Town Hall is located in Säynätsalo island on Lake Päijänne.

The city hosts the Neste Oil Rally Finland (formerly known as 1000 Lakes Rally). It is the biggest annually organised public event in the Nordic countries, gathering over 500,000 spectators every year. The rally has been held since 1951, first as a national competition, then from 1959 on as a European Rally Championship event and since the introduction of the World Rally Championship in 1973, as Finland's WRC event.

UNESCO World Heritage site Petäjävesi Old Church is located in vicinity of Jyväskylä.

Porvoo 

Porvoo has often been called an authentic small town and has been chosen as one of the most beautiful towns in Finland on several occasions. The city  is one of the six medieval towns in Finland, first mentioned as a city in texts from the 14th century. At the beginning of the 19th century, the city played an important role in connection with the Diet of Porvoo, when Finland, which at that time was part of the Russian Empire, gained autonomy in the form of the Grand Duchy of Finland.

The Porvoo Old Town is a popular tourist destination, known for its well-preserved 18th and 19th century buildings and 15th century cathedral, the Porvoo Cathedral. The Old Town together with Porvoo River River Valley is recognized as historically and culturally significant as one of the National landscapes of Finland. Porvoo is also culturally important in that many of the most significant writers, starting with J. L. Runeberg, are largely from Porvoo or its immediate sub-region municipalities (such as Johannes Linnankoski from Askola).

Attempts have been made to make the Porvoo Old Town a UNESCO World Heritage site, but so far it has not been qualified.

Cuisine 

Finnish cuisine includes fresh ingredients, particularly game and fish, foraged berries and mushrooms such as false morels, and even reindeer. Alcoholic drinks of note are Koskenkorva, the salty liquorice-flavored Salmiakki Koskenkorva and cloudberry liqueur.

Transportation 

The Finnish rail system is called VR. It offers InterCity and express trains throughout the country, and the faster Pendolino trains connecting the major cities. There are very large discounts (usually 50%) available for children (7-16 yr), students, senior citizens, and conscripts. There are international trains to St. Petersburg (Finnish and Russian day-time trains) and Moscow (Russian over-night train) in Russia. Connections to Sweden are by bus due to rail gauge differences. It's possible to take the Silja, Tallink and Viking Line ferries from Helsinki to Mariehamn in the Åland archipelago, Stockholm (Sweden), Rostock and Travemünde in Germany, and to Tallinn, (Estonia).The Viking Line rates are usually cheaper, but their ships are older and smaller compared to Tallink Silja Line ferries. NLC Ferry Ab Oy Wasaline ferry from Vaasa to Holmsund in Umeå.

There are about 25 airports in Finland with scheduled passenger services. Finnair, Blue1 and Finncomm Airlines provide air services both domestically and internationally. Helsinki-Vantaa airport is Finland's global gateway with scheduled non-stop flights to such places as Bangkok, Beijing, Guangzhou, Hong Kong, Miami, Nagoya, New Delhi, New York, Osaka, Seoul, Shanghai, Tokyo and Istanbul. Helsinki has an optimal location for great circle airline traffic routes between Western Europe and the Far East. Hence, many foreign tourists visit Helsinki on a stop-over while flying from Asia to Europe or vice versa. The Helsinki-Vantaa Airport was ranked 18th in the Skytrax World's Top 100 Airports survey.

See also
Provinces of Finland
Culture of Finland
Tourism
Tourism in Norway
Tourism in Sweden
Tourism in Denmark

References

External links 

 Come To Finland: Nostalgic Finnish Travel Posters - A book about the early marketing of Finland
 Visit Finland – Finland Travel Guide (by Finnish Tourist Board)
 Finnish Tourist Board
https://www.finlandprices.com/
https://www.travelpricewatch.com/helsinki-finland/

 
Finland